IF2 may refer to:
 Bacterial initiation factor 2
 Interceptor Force 2, a 2002 science fiction television film
 International Fujita scale - Tornado rating